'N Duisend Drome is the fourth album by South African pop/opera vocal quartet Romanz and the debut album for the joint project of Romanz and Nianell. It was released on 6 May 2011.

Track listing
N Duisend Drome"  
"Dans Saam Met My"
"Ons Twee"  
"Dierbare Jy"  
"Time To Say Goodbye"  
"La Voix - Jou Stem"  
"My Laaste Song Vir Jou"
"Mamma Pappa"
N Engel Kan Ook Val"  
"Vir Jou Sal Ek Als Hier Veruil"  
"Stil Binne My"  
"The Prayer"  
"Vat My Soos Ek Is"  
"Die Plek Waar Ek Behoort"  
"Kom Terug Huis Toe"

Charts

Weekly charts

References

External links 
Official Website Romanz
Official Website Nianell

2011 albums
Afrikaans albums
Romanz albums